Doug Green (August 22, 1955 – September 1, 2021) was an American politician. He was a Republican member of the Ohio House of Representatives for the 66th district from 2013 to 2020.

Biography
Green was elected in 2012, winning the Republican primary with 39% of the vote and defeating Democrat Ken McNeely in the general election with 75% of the vote. He previously served as auditor and recorder of Brown County, Ohio.

Green died at the age of 66 after contracting COVID-19 during the COVID-19 pandemic in Ohio.

References

1955 births
2021 deaths
Republican Party members of the Ohio House of Representatives
21st-century American politicians
Deaths from the COVID-19 pandemic in Ohio